Volker Rohrwick (born 16 July 1954) is a German gymnast. He competed at the 1976 Summer Olympics and the 1984 Summer Olympics.

References

External links
 

1954 births
Living people
German male artistic gymnasts
Olympic gymnasts of West Germany
Gymnasts at the 1976 Summer Olympics
Gymnasts at the 1984 Summer Olympics
People from Alzey-Worms
Sportspeople from Rhineland-Palatinate